Buddleja chenopodiifolia is a species endemic to the dry rocky or clay hillsides of southern Peru at altitudes of 2200–3100 m; it was first described and named by Kraenzlin in 1913.

Description
Buddleja chenopodiifolia is a dioecious shrub 1–2 m high, with dark brown fissured bark. The branches are subquadrangular and covered with a dense white tomentum. The membranaceous ovate leaves have 0.5–1 cm petioles, and are 4–8 cm long by 1.3–3.5 cm wide, glabrescent above but with white tomentum below. The yellowish-white leafy-bracted inflorescences are 10–20 cm long, comprising 6–14 pairs of globose heads < 1 cm in diameter, each head with 6–20 flowers; the corolla tubes are 1.7–2.5 mm long.

Cultivation
The shrub is not known to be in cultivation.

References

chenopodiifolia
Flora of Peru
Flora of South America
Taxa named by Friedrich Wilhelm Ludwig Kraenzlin
Dioecious plants